Films produced or distributed by the American company Film Booking Offices of America (FBO) active between 1918 and 1929 when it was merged into RKO Pictures. Originally formed as a distribution outlet for Robertson–Cole Pictures, the whole company subsequently adopted the name. The list does not include foreign-produced films distributed in the United States by FBO.

1910s

1920s

Bibliography
 Munden, Kenneth White. The American Film Institute Catalog of Motion Pictures Produced in the United States, Part 1. University of California Press, 1997.

Film Booking Offices of America films
Film Booking Offices of America
Film Booking Offices of America